Events in the year 1932 in Portugal.

Incumbents
President: Óscar Carmona
Prime Minister: Domingos Oliveira; António de Oliveira Salazar

Events
António de Oliveira Salazar becomes prime minister, leading to estado novo a year later

Arts and entertainment

Sports
S.C. Esmoriz founded
C.F. Estrela da Amadora founded

Births

11 January – Eduardo Barbeiro, swimmer.
31 May – António Tavares, sports shooter.
2 July – Dinis Vital, footballer (d. 2014)
26 July – Vasco de Almeida e Costa, naval officer and politician (died in 2010)
2 November – António Barbosa de Melo, lawyer and politician (d. 2016).

21 November – Domiciano Cavém, footballer (d. 2005 in Portugal)

23 December – Germano de Figueiredo, footballer (d. 2004).

Deaths

7 July – Artur Loureiro, painter (b. 1853).

References

 
1930s in Portugal
Portugal
Years of the 20th century in Portugal
Portugal